Cardedeu is a small town in the comarca of Vallès Oriental in the province of Barcelona and autonomous community of Catalonia, Spain. It is near Granollers, the capital of Vallès Oriental, and it is placed between Serralada Litoral and Montseny.

Cardedeu is a small town of medieval origin, with the first written reference known dated in the year 941.

Demography

References

 Panareda Clopés, Josep Maria; Rios Calvet, Jaume; Rabella Vives, Josep Maria (1989). Guia de Catalunya, Barcelona: Caixa de Catalunya.  (Catalan).

External links

 Cardedeu official page 
 Government data pages 

Municipalities in Vallès Oriental
Populated places in Vallès Oriental